Guadramiro is a municipality located in the province of Salamanca, in the autonomous community of Castile and León, Spain.

References

Municipalities in the Province of Salamanca